A high priest is a term often used to describe the leading figure in various religious organizations, particularly in antiquity.

High Priest may also refer to:

 High Priest (album),  by Alex Chilton
 High Priest (book), by Timothy Leary

See also 

 High priestess (disambiguation)